Myles Neal Brand (May 17, 1942 – September 16, 2009) was a philosopher and university administrator who served as the 14th president of the University of Oregon, the 16th president of Indiana University, and the fourth president of the National Collegiate Athletic Association (NCAA) of the United States.

Philosophical Work

Brand mainly focused on a metaphysical area known as the Philosophy of Action. Seminal works include The Nature of Human Action (1970) and a book called Intending and Acting: Toward a Naturalized Action Theory (1984.

In one of his major papers, Intentional Actions and Plans (1986), Brand defended the notion of intentional action as "action performed in following a plan", approaximating an initial formal definition for the concept as follows:(D1) S As intentionally during t iff

(i) S’s Aing during t is an action and

(ii) during t, S follows a plan that includes his Aing

(where S ranges over subjects, A over action types, and t over temporal durations) However, Brand is dissatisfied as he believes the definition "serves to delineate the reach of intentional action, but not its extent". In other words, the definition falls into the 'causal deviance problem' where one's action may not follow a plan, yet it may be intentional; so he alternatively proposes:(D2) S As intentionally during t iff

(i) S’s Aing during t is an action and

(ii) during t, S follows a plan that has subroutines  and his Aing is contained in at least one of

Personal life
Brand was born in Brooklyn, New York. His family moved to Jericho, New York on Long Island, but he was bused to Carle Place High School, as Jericho did not have a high school of its own. He graduated in 1960. He played lacrosse and basketball as a college freshman. Brand earned his Bachelor of Science degree in philosophy from Rensselaer Polytechnic Institute in 1964, and his Ph.D in philosophy from the University of Rochester in 1967.

Prior to serving at Indiana University, Brand was president at the University of Oregon from 1989 to 1994. Brand's other administrative posts include provost and vice president for academic affairs, Ohio State University, 1986–89; coordinating dean, College of Arts and Sciences, University of Arizona, 1985–86; dean, faculty of social and behavioral sciences, University of Arizona, 1983–86; director, Cognitive Science Program, University of Arizona, 1982–85; head, department of philosophy, University of Arizona, 1981–83; chairman, department of philosophy, University of Illinois at Chicago, 1972–80. He began his career in the department of philosophy, University of Pittsburgh, 1967–72. In 2003, he received an honorary degree in Doctor of Humane Letters from Oglethorpe University.

On January 17, 2009, it was announced that he had been diagnosed with pancreatic cancer and that his long-term prognosis was not good. He died of the disease at age 67 on September 16, 2009.

Tenure at Indiana University
Brand was president of Indiana University from 1994 through 2002; the school is a nine-campus institution of higher education with nearly 100,000 students, 17,000 employees and a budget of $3.4 billion. Brand oversaw the consolidation of the IU Medical Center Hospitals and Methodist Hospital to form Clarian Health Partners in 1997. Also, under his leadership, the university's endowment quadrupled and it became a leader annually in terms of overall private-sector support.

Brand may be best known for terminating men's head basketball coach Bob Knight in 2000. Reactions to the firing were varied with public opinion split with strong feelings one way or the other common across the state. The night of the firing a crowd estimated at 2,000, consisting mostly of students, vandalized the Showalter Fountain, the university football field and marched on the president's on-campus home, the Bryan House. During this unrest, Brand was hanged in effigy but fundraising with alumni and donors reached record highs. Knight was replaced by IU's first hire of an African American coach, Coach Mike Davis, who led the team to the Final Four in 2002.

One of his most notable and nationally acclaimed speeches was to the National Press Club in 2001, entitled, 'Academics First: Reforming Intercollegiate Athletics'. He underscored the need for the academic community to acknowledge and address the disparities that exist between intercollegiate athletics and the true mission of higher education.

On September 24, 2019, it was announced that the Informatics building on the IU-Bloomington campus would be re-named "Myles Brand Hall" in recognition of the "pathbreaking contributions that Brand made to the university and its academic core.”

NCAA leadership
In 2003, roughly two years after he fired Bob Knight, Brand left Indiana University to become president of the National Collegiate Athletic Association, located in Indianapolis. Brand was the first college president to head the NCAA.

Brand took the helm of the NCAA during a time when it was criticized for not valuing academics and education. Brand, a former college president and academic, was expected to bring new priorities to an institution previously governed by Cedric Dempsey, whose background was that of an athlete, coach and athletic administrator. Brand vowed to improve the overall experience for student-athletes, helping them attain both an education and increasing postgraduate opportunities. In a speech to the National Press Club, Brand said that "intercollegiate athletics can be a vital force in America's culture, exemplifying the positive spirit and values of our way of life," but he also expressed his strong belief "that academics must come first."

Brand had warned that the "arms race" among upper-echelon schools is the biggest dilemma confronting the NCAA's future success. "This escalation—this spiraling—of success demanding even more success has good people of noble intentions chasing both the carrot and their tails," he said.

Under his tenure the NCAA Executive Committee decided not to conduct championships on the campuses of member institutions where the use of nicknames and mascots representing American Indians is considered hostile and abusive.

Brand established a system for tracking each team's graduation rates, and brought attention to the fact that men's basketball teams had lower-than-average graduation rates.

Following Brand's death, Senior Vice-President Jim Isch was named interim president on September 22, 2009. Former University of Washington president Mark Emmert was named as the new permanent president of the NCAA in late 2010.

Legacy
In 2019, Indiana University renamed the Informatics buildings at the corner of 10th Street and Woodlawn Avenue on its Bloomington campus Myles Brand Hall in honor of its 16th president.

A website of his Collected Works  includes over 300 speeches, op eds, podcasts, and videos. A Special Issue of The Journal of Intercollegiate Sport co-edited by Peg Brand Weiser and R. Scott Kretchmar  entitled, "The Myles Brand Era at the NCAA: A Tribute and Scholarly Review" offers recollections and analysis by various peers and scholars of his goal to integrate athletics into academics, his pursuit of gender equity, racial parity, and other issues of social justice, and an understanding of his legacy of leadership style.

References

External links
 Collected Works
 The Myles Brand Era at the NCAA: A Tribute and Scholarly Review, Journal of Intercollegiate Sport, Vol. 14 No. 3 (2021)
 Entrance interview: Q&A with Myles Brand

1942 births
2009 deaths
Indiana University faculty
Ohio State University faculty
National Collegiate Athletic Association people
Presidents of the University of Oregon
Rensselaer Polytechnic Institute alumni
University of Arizona faculty
University of Pittsburgh faculty
University of Rochester alumni
University of Illinois Chicago faculty
People from Brooklyn
Deaths from pancreatic cancer
Presidents of Indiana University
Deaths from cancer in Indiana
Carle Place High School alumni
20th-century American academics